Mezira is a genus of flat bugs in the family Aradidae. There are more than 70 described species in Mezira.

Species
These 79 species belong to the genus Mezira:

 Mezira americana Spinola, 1852
 Mezira argentinensis Kormilev
 Mezira barberi Kormilev, 1964
 Mezira beta Kormilev
 Mezira bicolor Hoberlandt, 1963
 Mezira birabeni Kormilev
 Mezira boliviana Kormilev
 Mezira bonaerensis Kormilev
 Mezira brasiliensis Kormilev
 Mezira bruchi Kormilev, 1953
 Mezira carioca Kormilev
 Mezira championi Kormilev
 Mezira chemsaki Kormilev, 1982
 Mezira crenulata Kormilev
 Mezira cubana Kormilev
 Mezira drakei Hoberlandt, 1957
 Mezira emarginata (Say, 1832)
 Mezira equatoriana Kormilev
 Mezira eurycephala Kormilev
 Mezira formosa Kormilev, 1953
 Mezira fritzi Kormilev
 Mezira froeschneri Davidová-Vilímová, Taylor & McPherson, 1996
 Mezira germari
 Mezira ghanaensis Kormilev
 Mezira granulata (Say, 1832)
 Mezira granuliger Stal, 1860
 Mezira guanacastensis Kormilev, 1982
 Mezira guianensis Kormilev
 Mezira handlirschi (Bergroth, 1898)
 Mezira hondurensis Kormilev, 1982
 Mezira insularis Hoberlandt, 1963
 Mezira kiritshenkoi Hoberlandt, 1963
 Mezira laeviventris (Champion, 1898)
 Mezira lobata (Say, 1832)
 Mezira luteomaculata Kormilev, 1957
 Mezira luteonotata Kormilev
 Mezira membranacea (Fabricius, 1803)
 Mezira mexicana Kormilev
 Mezira minima Montrouzier, 1861
 Mezira minor Kormilev
 Mezira neonigripennis
 Mezira nigripennis Usinger, 1936
 Mezira novella Blatchley, 1924
 Mezira pacifica Usinger, 1936
 Mezira paraensis Kormilev & Heiss, 1979
 Mezira paragranuliger Kormilev, 1953
 Mezira paraguayensis Kormilev
 Mezira paralata Kormilev
 Mezira parva Hoberlandt, 1957
 Mezira pauperula Kormilev, 1962
 Mezira piligera Kormilev, 1971
 Mezira pilosula Kormilev, 1973
 Mezira placida Kormilev
 Mezira plaumanni Kormilev
 Mezira proseni Kormilev, 1953
 Mezira pusilla Kormilev
 Mezira reducta Van Duzee, 1927
 Mezira regularis Champion, 1898
 Mezira reuteri Bergroth, 1886
 Mezira saltensis Kormilev, 1953
 Mezira sanmartini Kormilev
 Mezira sayi Kormilev, 1982
 Mezira scrupulosa
 Mezira singularis Hoberlandt, 1957
 Mezira smithi Kormilev, 1982
 Mezira spissigrada Kormilev
 Mezira subsetosa
 Mezira tartagalensis Kormilev
 Mezira tremulae (Germar, 1822)
 Mezira trinidadensis Kormilev
 Mezira vanduzeei Usinger, 1936
 Mezira vianai Kormilev, 1953
 † Mezira crassifemur Wappler & Heiss, 2006
 † Mezira eckfeldensis Wappler & Heiss, 2006
 † Mezira eocenica Wappler & Heiss, 2006
 † Mezira parapetrificata Heiss & al., 2015
 † Mezira petrificata Heiss & al., 2015
 † Mezira scheveni Heiss, 2000
 † Mezira succinica Usinger, 1941

References

External links

 

Aradidae
Articles created by Qbugbot
Pentatomomorpha genera